Juan Frias (born 24 September 1918, date of death unknown) was a Mexican sailor. He competed in the Dragon event at the 1964 Summer Olympics.

References

External links
 

1918 births
Year of death missing
Mexican male sailors (sport)
Olympic sailors of Mexico
Sailors at the 1964 Summer Olympics – Dragon
Place of birth missing